Kawamura Station may refer to:
 Kawamura Station (Aichi), a guided bus station in Aichi Prefecture, Japan
 Kawamura Station (Kumamoto), a railway station in Kumamoto Prefecture, Japan on the Yunomae Line